The phrase No good deed goes unpunished is a sardonic commentary on the frequency with which acts of kindness backfire on those who offer them.  In other words, those who help others are doomed to suffer as a result of their helpfulness.

Background
The phrase is first attested in Walter Map's 12th-century De nugis curialium, in which a character who adhered to inverted morality "left no good deed unpunished, no bad one unrewarded".

Conventional moral wisdom holds that evil deeds are punished by divine providence and good deeds are rewarded by divine providence: 

This is related to the concepts of Hell and of karma.

The modern expression "No good deed goes unpunished" is an ironic twist on this conventional morality.

The ironic usage of the phrase appears to be a 20th-century invention, found for example in Brendan Gill's 1950 novel The Trouble of One House. It is also featured prominently in the song "No Good Deed", from the 2003 hit Broadway musical Wicked. A satirical poem by Franklin Pierce Adams with the title "No Good Deed Goes Unpunished (So Shines a Good Deed in a Naughty World)" also exists.

In 2005, author David Helvarg introduced the concept that the punishment may be a form of retaliation, in a piece he wrote for Grist Magazine, "Remember that sign they hung up in an EPA office during the Reagan administration, 'No good deed goes unpunished'? Under George Bush, no good science goes unpunished."

See also
 Flogging a dead horse
 Tragic hero
 Only the good die young

References

External links

Adages